{{DISPLAYTITLE:C15H19NO2}}
The molecular formula C15H19NO2 (molar mass: 245.32 g/mol, exact mass: 245.1416 u) may refer to:

 Bisnortilidine
 Tasimelteon
 Tropacocaine, or benzoylpseudotropine

Molecular formulas